The FC Basel 1912–13 season was their twentieth season since the club's foundation on 15 November 1893. The club's chairman was Ernst-Alfred Thalmann, all together it was his eleventh presidential term and his fifth season in succession. At the AGM Thalmann stood down and Karl Ibach took over. The club announced that to that point it had grown to have over 300 members at over half of them were active football players. FC Basel played their home games in the Landhof in the district Basel-Wettstein in Kleinbasel, Basel.

Overview 
Emil Hasler was the team captain for the fourth year running and as captain he led the trainings and was responsible for the line-ups. In their 1912–13 season Basel played a total of 37 matches, 19 were friendly games, 14 were in the domestic league and 5 in the Anglo Cup. 

Of the friendly games just three were played in the Landhof, six others were away games in Switzerland and ten games were played abroad. During the pre-season the team travelled to Germany twice, played against Karlsruher FC Phönix and Freiburger FC, and travelled to France to play Strassburger FV. During the winter break the team made a tour to North Rhine-Westphalia and before Christmas played VfR Mannheim, on Christmas day played ETB Schwarz-Weiss Essen and on boxing day played Düsseldorfer FC Fortuna 1911. The team came home with two victories and one defeat. At easter the team made a tour to eastern Germany. They played against SC Erfurt on easter Sunday, against Sportlust Dresden on easter monday and against SC Wacker Leipzig the day after. At the end of the season Basel played host to English club Preston North End. Of the friendly games 10 were won, three were drawn and six ended with a defeat.

The Swiss Serie A 1912–13 was divided into three regional groups, an east, a central and a west group. Basel were allocated to the central group together with local rivals Old Boys and Nordstern Basel. The other teams playing in this group were Young Boys, FC La Chaux-de-Fonds, Étoile-Sporting FC La Chaux-de-Fonds, FC Bern and Biel-Bienne. Basel started badly, with three defeats and a draw in the first four games. Despite seven victories and one draw during the next ten games, the team could not reduce the gap to the top of the league table. Basel ended the season in fourth position. They were four points behind group winners Old Boys, who continued to the finals. Lausanne Sports won the championship. Group bottom was Biel-Bienne, who therefore entered the play-off round against relegation, in which they were successful.

The Englishman Percy Humphreys was the first professional trainer that the club FC Basel had ever employed. Prior to Humphreys signing, it had always been the team captain who had taken over the function of the trainer. Under club chairman Karl Ibach, Humphreys signed his contract and began his duties on 1 April 1913. He had previously been head-coach for Hartlepool United in the English North Eastern League. 

The Anglo-Cup was a forerunner to the Swiss Cup. It was held for the fourth time this season and the first round was held on 1 May. In the first round Basel were drawn at home against lower classed Solothurn. In the second round, in the quarter-final and in the semi-final against East group teams, these being St. Gallen, Zürich and Winterthur and in that order. All these games were played at home in the Landhof and Basel won each game. In the final, which was played in the Hardau Stadium in Zürich on 29 June 1913, Basel played against lower classed Weissenbühl Bern and won 5–0. Humphreys led Basel to win their first national title. But memories of this soon faded, because the Anglo Cup was not played the following year and in fact it was discontinued completely due to World War I.

Players 
Squad members

Results 

Legend

Friendly matches

Pre-season

Winter break to end of season

Serie A

Central group results

Central group league table

Anglo-Cup

See also
 History of FC Basel
 List of FC Basel players
 List of FC Basel seasons

References

Sources 
 Rotblau: Jahrbuch Saison 2014/2015. Publisher: FC Basel Marketing AG. 
 Die ersten 125 Jahre. Publisher: Josef Zindel im Friedrich Reinhardt Verlag, Basel. 
 FCB team 1912–13 at fcb-archiv.ch
 Switzerland 1912-13 at RSSSF

External links
 FC Basel official site

FC Basel seasons
Basel